Arthur Addison Studenroth (October 9, 1899 – March 14, 1992) was an American athlete who competed mainly in the Cross Country Team. He competed for the United States in the 1924 Summer Olympics held in Paris, France in the Cross Country Team where he won the silver medal with his teammates Earl Johnson and August Fager.

References

See also
List of Pennsylvania State University Olympians

American male long-distance runners
Olympic silver medalists for the United States in track and field
Athletes (track and field) at the 1924 Summer Olympics
1899 births
1992 deaths
Medalists at the 1924 Summer Olympics
Olympic cross country runners